The Constitution of Slovakia, was the former constitution of the Slovak Republic. It was voted by the Slovak Diet, and came into effect on July 21, 1939.

See also
 Constitution of Slovakia
 Constitutional Court of Slovakia

References
 

Politics of Slovakia
1939 in law
Slovakia
1939 documents
1939 in Slovakia
Defunct constitutions